The Mysterious Mr. Wong is a tongue-in-cheek 1934 mystery film starring Bela Lugosi as a powerful Fu Manchu type criminal mastermind of the Chinatown underworld, and Wallace Ford as a wisecracking reporter. The film is based on Harry Stephen Keeler's 1928 short story "The Strange Adventure of the Twelve Coins of Confucius" one of three stories in Keeler's book Sing Sing Nights.  Despite the name of the title character and being directed by William Nigh, it has no relation to Monogram Pictures later Mr Wong film series. The character of Mr. Wong does not appear in the original story.

Plot
Bela Lugosi stars as Mr. Wong, a "harmless" Chinatown shopkeeper by day and relentless blood-thirsty pursuer of the Twelve Coins of Confucius by night. With possession of the coins, Mr. Wong will be supreme ruler of the Chinese province of Keelat, and his evil destiny will be fulfilled. A killing spree follows in dark and dangerous Chinatown as Wong gets control of 11 of the 12 coins. Though played up as a Tong war, ace reporter Jason Barton and his girl Peg are hot on his trail as is the Chinese Secret Service.  All parties soon find themselves in serious trouble when they stumble onto Wong's headquarters.

Cast
 Bela Lugosi	dual role as Mr. Fu Wong and as Li See
 Wallace Ford as	Jason H. Barton
 Arline Judge as Peg
 E. Alyn Warren as Philip Tsang 
 Lotus Long as Moonflower 
 Robert Emmett O'Connor as Officer McGillicuddy  
 Chester Gan as Tung aka "Hi Strung" 
 Edward Peil Sr. as Jen Yu - Wong Henchman  
 Luke Chan as Professor Chan Fu 
 Lee Shumway as Editor Steve Brandon 
 Etta Lee as Lu San 
 Ernest F. Young as Reporter Chuck Roberts

External links
 The Mysterious Mr. Wong at the Internet Movie Database 
 
 

1934 films
1934 mystery films
American black-and-white films
American mystery films
American detective films
Films directed by William Nigh
Monogram Pictures films
Films based on short fiction
1930s English-language films
1930s American films